The 2008–09 Slovenian Hockey League was the 18th season of the Slovenian Ice Hockey League. The competition was mostly made up of teams from Slovenia, but there were also two teams from Croatia.

At the end of the regular season, the playoffs were held. It was the first time that the playoffs featured a non-Slovenian team. Jesenice won the title after defeating Olimpija in the final.

Teams

 Alfa
 Bled
 HK Olimpija
 HDD Olimpija (play-offs only)
 Jesenice (play-offs only)
 Maribor
 Maribor II
 Medveščak
 Mladi Jesenice
 Mladost
 Slavija
 Triglav Kranj

Standings after the regular season

Play-offs

Round 1
Medveščak defeated Slavija 2–0 in a best of three series.
Medveščak – Slavija 9–1 (2–0, 5–0, 2–1)
Slavija – Medveščak 1–6 (0–1, 1–3, 0–2)

Maribor defeated Mladost 2–0 in a best of three series.
Maribor – Mladost 3–1
Mladost – Maribor 2–4 (0–1, 0–1, 2–2)

Triglav Kranj defeated Bled 2–1 in a best of three series.
Triglav Kranj – Bled 5–3 (1–2, 4–0, 0–1) 
Bled – Triglav Kranj 6–2 (1–1, 3–1, 2–0)
Triglav Kranj – Bled 6–0 (1–0, 4–0, 1–0)

HK Olimpija defeated Mladi Jesenice 2–0 in a best of three series.
HK Olimpija – Mladi Jesenice 4–1 (1–1, 2–0, 1–0) 
Mladi Jesenice – HK Olimpija 1–3 (0–2, 1–0, 0–1)

Quarter-finals
Maribor defeated Triglav Kranj 2–1 in a best of three series.
Maribor – Triglav Kranj 2–3 (0–1, 0–1, 2–1)
Triglav Kranj – Maribor 2–3 OT (0–0, 1–0, 1–2, 0–1)
Maribor – Triglav Kranj 7–2 (1–2, 4–0, 2–0)

Medveščak defeated HK Olimpija 2–0 in a best of three series.
Medveščak – HK Olimpija 3–2 (0–0, 0–1, 2–1, 1–0) OT
HK Olimpija – Medveščak 3–4 (0–1, 2–1, 1–2)

Semi-finals
Jesenice and HDD Olimpija joined in the semi-finals.

Jesenice defeated Maribor 2–0 in a best of three series.
Jesenice – Maribor 8–2 (3–1, 4–1, 1–0)
Maribor – Jesenice 2–3 (1–1, 1–1, 0–0, 0–1) OT

Olimpija defeated Medveščak 2–1 in a best of three series.
Olimpija – Medveščak 0–1 (0–1, 0–0, 0–0)
Medveščak – Olimpija 3–6 (2–2, 0–3, 1–1) 
Olimpija – Medveščak 4–1 (1–0, 2–1, 1–0)

Final
Jesenice defeated Olimpija 4–0 in a best of seven series.
Jesenice – Olimpija 5–2 (3–0, 2–1, 0–1)
Jesenice – Olimpija 2–1 (0–0, 1–0, 0–1, 0–0, 1–0)
Olimpija – Jesenice 0–2 (0–0, 0–1, 0–1) 
Olimpija – Jesenice 1–2 (0–1, 0–0, 1–1)

1
Slovenia
Slovenian Ice Hockey League seasons